Marta Catalina Velasco Campuzano (born June 18, 1971) is an economist from the Universidad de los Andes, a specialist in Urban Law from the Pontificia Universidad Javeriana and in public policies and urban management; She has a Master's in Public Policy from the University of Michigan and a PhD in political studies from the Externado de Colombia University.

During her career in the public sector, she served as Secretary of Planning, between 2006 and 2007; Secretary of Habitat, between 2008 and 2009, and worked as vice president of public services and regulation of the Grupo de Energía de Bogotá, between 2012 and 2013.

Since 2014, and until 2022, she has worked as a consultant in urban management and public policies.

Since August 11, 2022, she has held the position of Minister of Housing, City and Territory of her country, under the government of Gustavo Petro.

Trajectory
Velasco is an economist from the Universidad de los Andes. He is a specialist in urban law from the Pontificia Universidad Javeriana, a master's degree in Public Policy from the University of Michigan and a doctorate in political studies from the Externado de Colombia University.

Bogota Planning Secretary (2006-2007)
She began her professional life in 1989 as an economist and consultant for different companies until 2004. That year, the then mayor of Bogotá, Luis Eduardo Garzón, appointed her as Undersecretary of Planning and Finance of the Bogota District Education Secretariat. Subsequently, Garzón appointed her as District Planning Secretary between January 1, 2006, and January 1, 2007.

Secretary of Habitat of Bogotá (2008-2009)
The new mayor of Bogotá, Samuel Moreno, appointed her as District Habitat Secretary for the period between January 1, 2008, and October 31, 2009.

On February 1, 2012, she was appointed as Vice President of Public Services and Regulation of Empresa de Energía de Bogotá. She held the position that she held until November 15, 2013, during the mayoralty of Gustavo Petro Urrego. Since February 2014, she has been a consultant in Public Policy and Urban Management for the Bogota Mayor's Office during the administrations of Gustavo Petro Urrego and Claudia López Hernández.

Minister of Housing, City and Territory
On August 7, 2022, she was appointed by President Gustavo Petro as Minister of Housing of Colombia, accepting one of her biggest challenges in policy matters, she has been emphatic in the idea that Colombia has a robust business system, but there has not been a complete coverage of the drinking water system as well as basic sanitation, with the rural areas being the most affected, within her commitment as minister she has sought strategic allies for the implementation of some of the most important public policies of her position.

Notes

References

External links 

|-

1971 births
Living people
Cabinet of Gustavo Petro
Government ministers of Colombia
Women government ministers of Colombia
21st-century Colombian politicians
21st-century Colombian women politicians
Pontifical Xavierian University alumni
University of Michigan alumni
Universidad Externado de Colombia alumni
Politicians from Bogotá